Probability Surveys is an open-access electronic journal that is jointly sponsored by the Bernoulli Society and the Institute of Mathematical Statistics. It publishes review articles on topics of interest in probability theory.

Managing Editors
David Aldous (2004–2008)
Geoffrey Grimmett (2009–2011)
Laurent Saloff-Coste (2012–2014)
Ben Hambly (2014– )

Probability journals
Publications established in 2004
Institute of Mathematical Statistics academic journals